James O'Mara (6 August 1873 – 21 November 1948) was an Irish businessman and politician who became a nationalist leader and key member of the revolutionary First Dáil. As an MP in the House of Commons of the United Kingdom, he introduced the bill which made Saint Patrick's Day a national holiday in Ireland in 1903.

Early life
O'Mara was born in Limerick, son of Stephen O'Mara and Elen Pigott, and educated by the Christian Brothers in Limerick, and at Clongowes Wood College. His studies at the Royal University of Ireland were postponed after the death of his Uncle Jim in 1893, when James was sent to London to take over his Uncle's business functions. After his marriage in 1895 to Agnes Cashel, sister of the republican activist in later life Alice Cashel, he moved to Epsom in Surrey, and then to Sydenham in London. He finally got his B.A. degree from the Royal University in 1898.

Political career
In the 1900 general election, O'Mara was elected unopposed as Irish Parliamentary Party MP for South Kilkenny.

His career in House of Commons is noted for his introduction of Bank Holiday (Ireland) Act 1903, making Saint Patrick's Day a national holiday. O'Mara later introduced the law which required that pubs be closed on 17 March, a provision which was repealed only in the 1970s.

In 1907, O'Mara resigned from Parliament and from the Irish Parliamentary Party and later joined Sinn Féin, the first MP to do so. He returned to Dublin in 1914 to continue his work in the bacon business, and remained active in Sinn Féin.

Dáil Éireann
At the 1918 general election, he was Sinn Féin's Director of Finance and the party's fourth Director of Elections (his three predecessors having been imprisoned). He was elected as a Sinn Féin MP for his old constituency of Kilkenny South, defeating the Irish Party's Matthew Keating by 8,685 votes to 1,855. South Kilkenny was one of 73 constituencies returning Sinn Féin MPs pledged not to take their seats at Westminster. In the First Dáil Éireann he became Trustee of Dáil Éireann funds, and travelled to the United States with Éamon de Valera to pursue a fund-raising drive. He resigned his trusteeship and his Dáil seat in 1921 after a disagreement with de Valera.

A supporter of the 1921 Anglo-Irish Treaty, he was appointed as the first Irish Ambassador to the United States, but served only briefly.

After the death in 1923 of Philip Cosgrave, the Cumann na nGaedheal TD for Dublin South and brother of W. T. Cosgrave, O'Mara stood as the Cumann na nGaedheal candidate in the resulting by-election. Polling took place on 12 March 1924, and O'Mara was returned to the 4th Dáil, which sat until 1927. He did not contest the June 1927 Irish general election, and retired from politics.

He died on 21 November 1948 and is buried in Glasnevin Cemetery, Dublin. His wife Agnes died on 2 June 1958.

Sources
 (Limerick Leader, Saturday, 12 December 1998)
 James O'Mara family tree
Brian M. Walker (ed.), Parliamentary Election Results in Ireland, 1801-1922, Dublin, Royal Irish Academy, 1978

References

External links

 

1873 births
1948 deaths
Alumni of the Royal University of Ireland
Irish diplomats
Irish Parliamentary Party MPs
Early Sinn Féin TDs
Cumann na nGaedheal TDs
Members of the 1st Dáil
Members of the 4th Dáil
Members of the Parliament of the United Kingdom for County Kilkenny constituencies (1801–1922)
UK MPs 1900–1906
UK MPs 1906–1910
UK MPs 1918–1922
Politicians from Limerick (city)
Burials at Glasnevin Cemetery
People educated at Clongowes Wood College
Businesspeople from Limerick (city)